The Musical Fund Hall in Philadelphia is a landmark building of both architectural and historic significance, noted especially for the illustrious persons who have spoken or performed there.  It is perhaps best remembered as the setting for the first Republican National Convention, June 17–19, 1856. It was listed on the National Register of Historic Places in 1971.

History
Originally the building housed the First Presbyterian Church; it was converted into the largest musical auditorium in Philadelphia by William Strickland and opened in December 1824.

Noted for its fine acoustics, the Hall was described in a newspaper review of the first concert: "The room is exceedingly neat, and its decoration does honor to the taste of Mr. Strickland, an architect of whom Philadelphia may be justly proud. It is one hundred and six feet long, sixty feet wide, and twenty-six feet high, and is admirably calculated for the conveyance of sound..."  As it continued to serve as the leading concert hall in the city, the building was renovated in 1847 by Napoleon LeBrun and expanded by architect Addison Hutton in 1891.

Internationally known musical artists, authors and lecturers graced the stage of the Musical Fund Hall, including:

1825: Marquis de Lafayette, honored at a reception
1827: Maria Malibran
1848: Ole Bull, violinist
1842: Charles Dickens 
1850 and 1851: Jenny Lind, "the Swedish Nightingale"; Ede Reményi
1852: Henriette Sontag and Adelina Patti
1853 and 1856: William Makepeace Thackeray, lectures on the "English Humorists" (1853) and "Charity and Humor" (1856) 
1897: poet Paul Laurence Dunbar read selections of his own works

Renowned pianists such as Louis Gottschalk, Kossowski, Sigismond Thalberg, and Wolfsohn also appeared at the Hall.

In 1856, the first National Republican Convention was held at the Musical Fund Hall.  John C. Frémont was nominated on the second ballot.  William L. Dayton of New Jersey was the vice-presidential nominee.

With its busy and notable schedule of events, 1856 was the banner year for the Musical Fund Hall.  By the end of the year, the 3,000-seat Philadelphia Academy of Music opened and immediately supplanted the Musical Fund Hall as the premier venue for concerts and lectures in the city.  The Musical Fund Society moved its concerts to the Academy of Music in 1868.

After seeing use as (among other things) a boxing arena and a tobacco warehouse, the Hall was abandoned, then was converted into condominiums.  As a result of the conversion, the auditorium no longer exists.  The building was removed from the list of National Historic Landmarks but it retains a position on the National Register of Historic Places.

Around 1900, the society was a main proponent in creating the Philadelphia Orchestra. In 1982, The Musical Fund Society's document collection including manuscripts of European music as well as music by Pennsylvania composers, went to the library of the University of Pennsylvania.

References

Theatres on the National Register of Historic Places in Pennsylvania
Concert halls in Pennsylvania
Religious buildings and structures completed in 1824
Washington Square West, Philadelphia
Buildings and structures in Philadelphia
National Register of Historic Places in Philadelphia